Karol Beck and Rik de Voest were the defending champions but they decided not to participate.
German team and fourth seeds Christopher Kas and Tim Pütz won the title over Benjamin Becker and Daniele Bracciali

Seeds

Draw

Draw

References
 Main Draw

Internazionali Tennis Val Gardena Sudtirol - Doubles
2013 Doubles